The 1937 Victorian state election was held on 2 October 1937.

Retiring members
George Prendergast (Labor, Footscray) died shortly before the election. No by-election was held.

No members retired at this election.

Legislative Assembly
Sitting members are shown in bold text. Successful candidates are highlighted in the relevant colour. Where there is possible confusion, an asterisk (*) is also used.

See also
1937 Victorian Legislative Council election

References

Psephos - Adam Carr's Election Archive

Victoria
Candidates for Victorian state elections